Khadga J.B.M. was a Nepali folk singer of the Western Development Region in the 20th century whose great contributions to Nepali folk songs continue to be sung even now in most parts of WDR such as Syangja, Palpa, Nawalparasi, Gulmi, Gorkha, Pokhara, Butwal, Bhairahawa, etc.

References

Nepalese folk singers
1928 births
2021 deaths